Dartmouth Big Green ice hockey may refer to either of the ice hockey teams that represent Dartmouth College:

Dartmouth Big Green men's ice hockey
Dartmouth Big Green women's ice hockey